Cosetta Greco (8 October 1930 – 14 July 2002) was an Italian film actress. She appeared in more than 30 films between 1943 and 1971.

Selected filmography

 Farewell Love! (1943) - La cameriera di casa Dias
 Caccia all'uomo (1948) - (uncredited)
 The Charterhouse of Parma (1948) - (uncredited)
 The Bride Can't Wait (1949) - Young Nun
 Four Ways Out (1951) - Lina Girosi - moglie di Luigi
 The Cape of Hope (1951) - Minnie Liakim
 Napoleone (1951)
 Three Girls from Rome (1952) - Elena
 The Bandit of Tacca Del Lupo (1952) - Zitamaria 
 Article 519, Penal Code (1952) - Clara Martini
 The Enemy (1952) - Marta
 Sunday Heroes (1952) - Mara
 Canzoni di mezzo secolo (1952)
 Il viale della speranza (1953) - Luisa
 Voice of Silence (1953) - Anna Maria
 Cavalcade of Song (1953) - Ex-amante del guappo
 Musoduro (1953) - Anita
 Scampolo 53 (1953)
 It Takes Two to Sin in Love (1954) - Luisa Galli
 Chronicle of Poor Lovers (1954) - Elisa
 Foglio di via (1954) - Lucia
 Napoléon (1955) - Elisa Baccioli
 The Lost City (1955) - María
 Je suis un sentimental (1955) - Alice Gérard
 I pappagalli (1955) - Giulietta
 Wild Love (1956) - Ines
 Dreams in a Drawer (1957) - Lina
 Cronache del '22 (1961)
 Plagio (1969) - Edera
 Sheriff of Rock Springs (1971)

References

External links

1930 births
2002 deaths
Italian film actresses
20th-century Italian actresses